Alison Riske was the defending champion but chose not to participate.

Alison Van Uytvanck won the title, defeating Arina Rodionova in the final, 7–6(7–3), 6–2.

Seeds

Draw

Finals

Top half

Bottom half

References

External Links
Main Draw

Surbiton Trophy - Singles